Dodgetown is an unincorporated community in Stokes County in the U.S. state of North Carolina, a little over a mile south of Prestonville on North Carolina State Highway 772, and about five miles east of the county seat, Danbury.

Unincorporated communities in Stokes County, North Carolina
Unincorporated communities in North Carolina